Six is the title of Loverboy's sixth studio album, released in 1997. It is the band's first album with new material since 1987, and their last album to feature the original lineup, as bassist Scott Smith died in a boating accident in 2000.

Track listing
"Big Picture" (Dean, Reno, Smith, Kevin McKenzie) – 4:42
"Love of Money" (Dean, Reno) – 4:01
"Secrets" (Dean, Reno, Alex Chuaqui) – 5:12
"Waiting for the Night" (Dean, Reno) – 4:27
"Nobody Cares" (Dean, Reno, Doug Johnson) – 5:29
"Goodbye Angel" (David Steele, Kenny Gitros) – 4:36
"Create a Monster" (Dean, Reno, Alex Chaqui) – 4:11
"Hair of the Dog" (Dean, Reno, Smith, Frenette) – 4:33
"Maybe Someday" (Dean, Kevin McKenzie) – 5:17
"Spinnin' My Wheels" (Dean, Reno) – 4:47
"So Much for Love" (Dean, Reno, Geraldo Dominelli, Gerry Doucette) – 3:58
"Tortured" (Dean, Reno, Doug Johnson, Kevin McKenzie) – 6:01
"Domino Effect" (Dean, Reno, Manny Carlton) – 4:13 [Japan bonus track]

Personnel 
All information from the album booklet.

Loverboy
Mike Reno – lead vocals, producer
Paul Dean – guitar, vocals, producer, recording, mixing
Doug Johnson – keyboards on "Spinnin' My Wheels" and "Tortured"
Scott Smith – bass, vocals
Matt Frenette – drums

Additional musicians
Norm Fisher – bass
Eric Webster – keyboards on "So Much For Love"
Richard Sera – keyboards, vocals

Production
Paul Baker – engineering
Marc Ramaer – engineering
Craig Waddell – mastering
Ralph Alfonso – design
Annamaria DiSanto – photography
George Lembesis – photography

References 

1997 albums
Loverboy albums
CMC International albums